Pellifronia is a genus of sea snails, marine gastropod mollusks in the subfamily Pellifroniinae  of the family Terebridae, the auger snails, sunfamily Pellifroniinae (

Species
Species within the genus Pellifronia include:
 Pellifronia brianhayesi (Terryn & Sprague, 2008)
 Pellifronia jungi (Lai, 2001)

References

 Terryn Y. & Holford M. (2008) The Terebridae of Vanuatu with a revision of the genus Granuliterebra, Oyama 1961. Visaya Supplement 3: 1-96. page(s): 44

Terebridae
Gastropod genera